Winchendon may refer to:

Places
In the United Kingdom:
 Nether Winchendon, Buckinghamshire
 Upper Winchendon, Buckinghamshire

In the United States:
 Winchendon, Massachusetts, a New England town
 Winchendon (CDP), Massachusetts, the main village in the town

Other uses
 Baron Wharton, a title in the Peerage of England